Hans Lutz (born 31 March 1949) is a retired track cyclist and road bicycle racer from Germany, who represented West Germany at the 1976 Summer Olympics in Montreal, Quebec, Canada. There he won the gold medal in the Men's Team Pursuit, alongside Gregor Braun, Peter Vonhof and Günther Schumacher. Four years earlier, when Munich hosted the Summer Olympics, he won the bronze medal in the Men's 4.000m Individual Pursuit.

1973, 1974 and 1975 Hans Lutz became world champion with the West German track four times in a row

References

External links
 

1949 births
Living people
German male cyclists
Cyclists at the 1972 Summer Olympics
Cyclists at the 1976 Summer Olympics
Olympic cyclists of West Germany
Olympic gold medalists for West Germany
Olympic bronze medalists for West Germany
Sportspeople from Stuttgart
Olympic medalists in cycling
Medalists at the 1972 Summer Olympics
Medalists at the 1976 Summer Olympics
German track cyclists
Cyclists from Baden-Württemberg